HC Oceláři Třinec (Třinec Steelers) is a Czech ice hockey team from Třinec who play in the Czech Extraliga, the top tier of Czech ice hockey. Their home arena is the Werk Arena. The team's main sponsors are the local Třinec Iron and Steel Works

The team has won the Czech Extraliga four times, most recently in the 2021–22 season.

Honours

Domestic
Czech Extraliga

  Winners (4): 2010–11, 2018–19, 2020–21, 2021–22
  Runners-up (3): 1993–94, 2014–15, 2017–18
  3rd place (1): 1998–99

Czech 1. Liga
  Runners-up (1): 1994–95

1st. Czech National Hockey League
  3rd place (1): 1991–92

Pre-season
Spengler Cup
  Runners-up (1): 2019

Tatra Cup
  Winners (1): 2010

Steel Cup
  Winners (1): 2014

Rona Cup
  Winners (4): 1999, 2000, 2004, 2017

Players

Current roster

See also
 Třinec Iron and Steel Works

References

External links

Notes

Ice hockey clubs established in 1929
Trinec
Trinec
Sport in Třinec
1929 establishments in Czechoslovakia